Bastien Chesaux (born 2 November 1991) is a Swiss former motorcycle racer. He competed in the 125cc World Championship, the 250cc World Championship, the Supersport World Championship and the European Superstock 600 Championship. He retired from racing in 2015.

Career statistics

Grand Prix motorcycle racing

By season

Races by year
(key)

Supersport World Championship

Races by year
(key)

References

External links
 Profile on MotoGP.com
 Profile on WorldSBK.com

1991 births
Living people
Swiss motorcycle racers
125cc World Championship riders
250cc World Championship riders
Supersport World Championship riders
Sportspeople from Lausanne